Matthew Michael Kenneth Cooper (17 April 1948 – 11 October 2015) was a British rower. Cooper competed at the 1968 Summer Olympics where he finished in tenth place in the men's eight. He won the coxless pairs with Jeremiah McCarthy, rowing for a Vesta and Argosies composite, at the inaugural 1972 National Rowing Championships before competing in the 1972 Summer Olympics, where the same pair reached the semi finals of the men's coxless pair.

References

1948 births
2015 deaths
British male rowers
Olympic rowers of Great Britain
Rowers at the 1968 Summer Olympics
Rowers at the 1972 Summer Olympics
People from Boston, Lincolnshire